Redheugh railway station served the town of Gateshead, Tyne and Wear, England from 1837 to 1854 on the Newcastle and Carlisle Railway.

History 
The station opened on 1 March 1837 by the Newcastle and Carlisle Railway. It was originally the eastern terminus until  opened in 1839. To the west was a mineral line that carried passengers. There were two goods yard next to each other near a quay. There was also a locomotive shed that held up to two engines. Goods traffic ceased in 1853 and the station closed in May 1854.

References

External links 

Disused railway stations in Tyne and Wear
Railway stations in Great Britain opened in 1837
Railway stations in Great Britain closed in 1853
1837 establishments in England
1853 disestablishments in England